Auchenflower Stadium (currently known under naming rights as NAB Stadium) is an Australian basketball centre in Auchenflower, Queensland. The eight-court arena was the home of NBL side Brisbane Bullets until 1983. During that time, it was often referred to as The Auchendome. The facilities cater for those using wheelchairs.

During the 2010–11 Queensland floods, nine feet of water flooded the complex.

It also hosted the 2014 NBL Blitz during the pre-season of the 2014–15 NBL season, which saw the Townsville Crocodiles win the pre-season championship.

Other major events that were held at the venue include the 2013 Australian National Basketball Championships, the 2011 U14 National Australian Basketball Championship and the 2014 U16 Boys State Basketball Championship.

See also

Basketball in Australia
Sport in Brisbane

References

Brisbane Bullets
Sports venues in Brisbane
Basketball venues in Australia
Defunct National Basketball League (Australia) venues
Auchenflower, Queensland